I'm Pets is the debut studio album by Taiwanese singer Pets Tseng. It was released on 17 December 2014, by Linfair Records.

Track listing

Music videos

References

External links
 Linfair Records - 曾沛慈 我是曾沛慈 I'm Pets 

2014 debut albums
Pets Tseng albums